The Audi Type E was a passenger car introduced by Audi in 1913. It was the largest pre-war car from Audi.

The vehicle had a four-cylinder two-block in-line engine with 5,699 cc of displacement. It developed over a four-speed countershaft gearbox and a propeller shaft, which drove the rear wheels. The foot brake operated via a mechanical linkage on the drive shaft.

The car had a ladder frame and two leaf-sprung solid axles. It was available with various closed, semi-closed and open topped "Touring car" bodies, including a Laundaulet (with a large enclosed passenger compartment at the back and a semi-open front bench for the chauffeur and a front passenger) by the coach-builder Deissner of Köthen.

350 Type Es were produced.

Specification

Sources
 Schrader, Halwart: Deutsche Autos 1885-1920, Motorbuch Verlag Stuttgart, 1. Auflage (2002), 
 

Type E
Cars introduced in 1912
1920s cars